In five-dimensional geometry, a runcinated 5-orthoplex is a convex uniform 5-polytope with 3rd order truncation (runcination) of the regular 5-orthoplex.

There are 8 runcinations of the 5-orthoplex with permutations of truncations, and cantellations. Four are more simply constructed relative to the 5-cube.

Runcinated 5-orthoplex

Alternate names 
 Runcinated pentacross
 Small prismated triacontiditeron (Acronym: spat) (Jonathan Bowers)

Coordinates 
The vertices of the can be made in 5-space, as permutations and sign combinations of:
 (0,1,1,1,2)

Images

Runcitruncated 5-orthoplex

Alternate names
 Runcitruncated pentacross
 Prismatotruncated triacontiditeron (Acronym: pattit) (Jonathan Bowers)

Coordinates 
Cartesian coordinates for the vertices of a runcitruncated 5-orthoplex, centered at the origin, are all 80 vertices are sign (4) and coordinate (20) permutations of
 (±3,±2,±1,±1,0)

Images

Runcicantellated 5-orthoplex

Alternate names 
 Runcicantellated pentacross
 Prismatorhombated triacontiditeron (Acronym: pirt) (Jonathan Bowers)

Coordinates 
The vertices of the runcicantellated 5-orthoplex can be made in 5-space, as permutations and sign combinations of:
 (0,1,2,2,3)

Images

Runcicantitruncated 5-orthoplex

Alternate names 
 Runcicantitruncated pentacross
 Great prismated triacontiditeron (gippit) (Jonathan Bowers)

Coordinates 

Images

Snub 5-demicube 

Related polytopes 

This polytope is one of 31 uniform 5-polytopes generated from the regular 5-cube or 5-orthoplex.

Notes

References 
 H.S.M. Coxeter: 
 H.S.M. Coxeter, Regular Polytopes, 3rd Edition, Dover New York, 1973 
 Kaleidoscopes: Selected Writings of H.S.M. Coxeter, edited by F. Arthur Sherk, Peter McMullen, Anthony C. Thompson, Asia Ivic Weiss, Wiley-Interscience Publication, 1995,  
 (Paper 22) H.S.M. Coxeter, Regular and Semi Regular Polytopes I, [Math. Zeit. 46 (1940) 380-407, MR 2,10]
 (Paper 23) H.S.M. Coxeter, Regular and Semi-Regular Polytopes II, [Math. Zeit. 188 (1985) 559-591]
 (Paper 24) H.S.M. Coxeter, Regular and Semi-Regular Polytopes III, [Math. Zeit. 200 (1988) 3-45]
 Norman Johnson Uniform Polytopes, Manuscript (1991)
 N.W. Johnson: The Theory of Uniform Polytopes and Honeycombs, Ph.D. 
  x3o3o3x4o - spat, x3x3o3x4o - pattit, x3o3x3x4o - pirt, x3x3x3x4o - gippit

External links 
 
 Polytopes of Various Dimensions, Jonathan Bowers
 Runcinated uniform polytera (spid), Jonathan Bowers
 Multi-dimensional Glossary

5-polytopes